Flamboro Speedway is a 1/3-mile semi-banked asphalt short track motor racing oval, located twenty minutes northwest of Hamilton, in the rural community of Millgrove, Ontario, Canada. The track was established in 1962.

Overview

The track hosts a weekly Saturday night stock car racing program that runs from May to October each year. The tracks weekly racing program features five categories: Pro-Late Model, Super Stocks, Mini Stocks, Pure Stocks and Pro 4 Modified. 

The track also regularly features touring series including the APC United Late Model Series, Ontario Sportsman Series, OSCAAR Modifieds, Hot Rods and Pro Sprints, the Ontario Outlaw Super Late Model Series, Can-Am Midgets and Legends car racing.

Flamboro speedway has a go-cart track contained with the oval; which is utilized by the Waterloo Region Karting Club.

In 2011, the speedway celebrated its 50th anniversary.

NASCAR Pinty's Series

The NASCAR Pinty's Series made its first trip to Flamboro Speedway for a doubleheader event on August 29, 2020. Jason Hathaway and Kevin Lacroix won races during the inaugural event.

See also
 Short track motor racing
 Oval track racing
 List of sports venues in Hamilton, Ontario

References

External links
 Flamboro Speedway
 Flamboro Stadium and Speedway Hall of Fame and Museum

Motorsport venues in Ontario
Paved oval racing venues in Ontario
Stock car racing
Motorsport in Canada
NASCAR tracks
Sports venues in Hamilton, Ontario
1962 establishments in Ontario
Sports venues completed in 1962